A Book of Human Language is a studio album by the American rapper Aceyalone. It was released on Project Blowed in 1998. The album was entirely produced by Mumbles.

Critical reception
Bill Cassel of AllMusic wrote: "Aceyalone wins major points for even trying to tackle weighty topics like life, death, time, and language." Brian Coleman of CMJ New Music Monthly called it "one of the most intelligent albums" of the year. Malik Singleton of Vibe described it as "an uninhibited exhibition of lyric artistry laid over jazzy breakbeats and rare groove loops."

In 2014, Paste ranked the album at number five on their list of "12 Classic Hip-Hop Albums That Deserve More Attention".

The following year, Fact placed it at number 24 on its list of the "100 Best Indie Hip-Hop Records of All Time".

Track listing

References

External links
 

1998 albums
Aceyalone albums